The 2015 Copa Amsterdam was the 11th edition of the Copa Amsterdam (Aegon Copa Amsterdam), which took place at the Olympic Stadium in Amsterdam from 23 to 25 May 2015.

Teams participating in this edition:

  Ajax
  Arsenal
  Lazio
  Anderlecht
  Trenčín
  Club Guaraní
  Beşiktaş
  Rosenborg

Group stage

Group 1

Group 2

Play Offs

Seventh Place Playoff

Fifth Place Playoff

Semi-finals

Third place match

Final

References

2015
2014–15 in Dutch football
2014–15 in English football
2014–15 in Italian football
2014–15 in Belgian football
2014–15 in Slovak football
2014–15 in Turkish football
2015 in Norwegian football
2015 in Paraguayan football